Instant Karma may refer to:

 "Instant Karma!", a 1970 song by John Lennon
 Instant Karma (band), an Indian dance music group
 Instant Karma (film), a 1990 film
 Instant Karma (record label), an independent record label
 Instant Karma: All-Time Greatest Hits, a John Lennon compilation album
 Instant Karma: The Amnesty International Campaign to Save Darfur, a benefit album released in 2007
 "Instant Karma", a sixth-season episode of House, M.D.
 Instant Karma, a Sony Pictures Animation film

See also
 Karma